This is a list of  Republicans and conservatives who announced their opposition to the election of Donald Trump, the 2016 Republican Party nominee and eventual winner of the election, as the President of the United States. It also includes former Republicans who left the party due to their opposition to Trump and as well as Republicans who endorsed a different candidate. It includes Republican presidential primary election candidates that announced opposition to Trump as the nominee. Some of the Republicans on this list threw their support to Trump after he won the presidential election, while many of them continue to oppose Trump. Offices listed are those held at the time of the 2016 election.

Government officials

Former U.S. presidents

 George H. W. Bush, President of the United States (1989–1993); Vice President of the United States (1981–1989) (voted for Hillary Clinton)
 George W. Bush, President of the United States (2001–2009); Governor of Texas (1995–2000) (blanked ballot)

Former 2016 Republican presidential primary candidates
All candidates signed a pledge to eventually support the party nominee. The following refused to honor it after Trump became the Republican presidential nominee.

 Jeb Bush, Governor of Florida (1999–2007)
 Mark Everson, Commissioner of Internal Revenue (2003–2007)
 Carly Fiorina, CEO of Hewlett-Packard (1999–2005); 2010 nominee for U.S. Senator from California (originally endorsed Trump for the general election but called for Mike Pence to take his place as nominee after the Access Hollywood Tape surfaced)
 Lindsey Graham, United States Senator from South Carolina (2003–present) (voted for Evan McMullin) 
 John Kasich, Governor of Ohio (2011–2019); U.S. Representative from Ohio (1983–2001) (wrote in John McCain)
 George Pataki, Governor of New York (1995–2006)

Former federal cabinet-level officials

Governors

Sitting

 Charlie Baker, Massachusetts (2015–2023)
 Robert J. Bentley, Alabama (2011–2017)
 Dennis Daugaard, South Dakota (2011–2019)
 Bill Haslam, Tennessee (2011–2019)
 Gary Herbert, Utah (2009–2021)
 Larry Hogan, Maryland (2015–2023) (wrote in father Lawrence Hogan)
 John Kasich, Ohio (2011–2019)
 Susana Martinez, New Mexico (2011–2019); Chair of the Republican Governors Association (2015–2016)
 Bruce Rauner, Illinois (2015–2019)
 Brian Sandoval, Nevada (2011–2019)
 Rick Snyder, Michigan (2011–2019)

Former

 Arne Carlson, Minnesota (1991–1999) (endorsed Hillary Clinton)
 Jim Douglas, Vermont (2003–2011)
 A. Linwood Holton Jr., Virginia (1970–1974); Assistant Secretary of State for Legislative Affairs (1974–1975) (endorsed Hillary Clinton – father in law of running mate Tim Kaine)
 Jon Huntsman Jr., Governor of Utah (2005–2009); United States Ambassador to Russia (2017–2019); United States Ambassador to China (2009–2011); United States Ambassador to Singapore (1992–1993)
 Gary Johnson, New Mexico (1995–2003) (2016 Libertarian nominee for president)
 William Milliken, Michigan (1969–1983) (endorsed Hillary Clinton)
 Kay A. Orr, Nebraska (1987–1991)
Tim Pawlenty, Minnesota (2003–2011) (voted for Trump)
 Al Quie, Minnesota (1979-1983)
 Marc Racicot, Montana (1993–2001); Chair of the Republican National Committee (2001–2003)
 Mitt Romney, Massachusetts (2003–2007), 2012 nominee for President (wrote in wife Ann Romney)
 Arnold Schwarzenegger, California (2003–2011) (wrote in John Kasich)
 Jane Swift, Massachusetts (2001–2003) (voted for Hillary Clinton)
 Bill Weld, Massachusetts (1991–1997) (2016 Libertarian nominee for vice president)

U.S. Senators

Sitting

Former
James Buckley, U.S. Senator from New York (1971–1977)

 Norm Coleman, Minnesota (2003–2009)
 David Durenberger, Minnesota (1978–1995) (endorsed Hillary Clinton)
 Slade Gorton, Washington (1981–1987, 1989–2001) (endorsed Evan McMullin)
 Phil Gramm, Texas (1985-2002)
 Gordon J. Humphrey, New Hampshire (1979–1990) (endorsed Hillary Clinton)
 George LeMieux, Florida (2009–2011)
 Olympia Snowe, Maine (1995–2013)
 Paul Trible, Virginia (1983-1989)
 John Warner, Virginia (1979–2009); United States Secretary of the Navy (1972–1974) (endorsed Hillary Clinton)

U.S. Representatives

Sitting

Former

Former State Department officials

Former Defense Department officials

Former National Security officials

Other former federal government officials

 Donald B. Ayer, United States Deputy Attorney General
 Phillip D. Brady, White House Staff Secretary; White House Cabinet Secretary (endorsed Hillary Clinton)
 Paul K. Charlton, United States Attorney
 Linda Chavez, Director of the Office of Public Liaison; 1986 nominee for U.S. Senator from Maryland
 Jim Cicconi, White House Staff Secretary (endorsed Hillary Clinton)
 Scott Evertz, Director of the Office of National AIDS Policy (endorsed Hillary Clinton)
 Linda Fisher, Former Deputy EPA Administrator 
Tony Fratto, Deputy White House Press Secretary
 Charles Fried, United States Solicitor General; Associate Justice of the Massachusetts Supreme Judicial Court (endorsed Hillary Clinton)
David K. Garman, Former Assistant Secretary and Under Secretary of Energy
 Fred T. Goldberg, Jr., Assistant Secretary of the Treasury for Tax Policy; Commissioner of Internal Revenue (endorsed Hillary Clinton)
 Theodore Kassinger, United States Deputy Secretary of Commerce
 Bill Kristol, Chief of Staff to the Vice President and founder of The Weekly Standard (endorsed Evan McMullin)
 Thomas Mallon, Deputy Chairman of the National Endowment for the Humanities
 Rosario Marin, Treasurer of the United States (endorsed Hillary Clinton)
 John McKay, former United States Attorney (endorsed Hillary Clinton)
 Andrew Natsios, Administrator of the United States Agency for International Development; Chair of the Massachusetts Republican Party
 Daniel F. Runde, Director of the Global Development Alliance
 Larry D. Thompson, United States Deputy Attorney General
 Dan Webb, former United States Attorney (endorsed Hillary Clinton)
 Peter Wehner, Director of the Office of Strategic Initiatives
 Lezlee Westine, Director of the Office of Public Liaison (endorsed Hillary Clinton)
 Peter Zeidenberg, Assistant United States Attorney
 Jeffrey Bobeck, former Bush 43 DOE Director of Communications, and 2016 DC Republican Delegate

State officials

Sitting
 Brian Calley, Lieutenant Governor of Michigan (2011–2019)
 Spencer Cox, Lieutenant Governor of Utah (2013–2021)
 Kim Guadagno, Lieutenant Governor of New Jersey (2010–2018)
 Karyn Polito, Lieutenant Governor of Massachusetts (2015–2023)
 Phil Scott, Lieutenant Governor of Vermont (2011–2017)

Former

State legislators
Sitting
 Rocky Chavez, California State Representative (2012–present)
 Jack Ciattarelli, New Jersey State Representative (2011–2018)
 Neal Collins, South Carolina State Representative (2014–present)
 Kurt Daudt, Minnesota State Representative (2011–present), Speaker of the Minnesota House of Representatives (2015–2019)
 David Johnson, Iowa State Senator (2003–present)
 Mark B. Madsen, Utah State Senator (2005–2017) (endorsed Gary Johnson)
 Chad Mayes, California State Assembly Minority Leader (2014–2017)
 Charisse Millett, Alaska State Representative (2009–2019), Majority Leader (2015–2016)
 Ross Spano, Florida State Representative (2012–present)
 Joe Sweeney, New Hampshire State Representative (2012–present)
 Jim Durkin, Illinois House Republican Leader (1996-2003; 2006–present)

Former
 Michael Balboni, New York State Senator (1998–2007) (endorsed Hillary Clinton)
 Lois Sherman Hagarty, Pennsylvania State Representative (1980–1992)
 Brian Lees, Massachusetts State Senator (1989–2007), Minority Leader (1993–2007)
 Jack McGregor, Pennsylvania State Senator (1963–1970) (endorsed Hillary Clinton)
 Chris Vance, Former member of the Washington House of Representatives from the 31st district, Nominee for the U.S. Senate in 2016
 Will Weatherford, Florida State Representative (2006–2014), Speaker of the Florida House of Representatives (2012–2014)

Municipal officials
 Joel Giambra, former Erie County Executive (endorsed Hillary Clinton)
 Carlos A. Giménez, Mayor of Miami-Dade County (endorsed Hillary Clinton)
 Danny Jones, Mayor of Charleston, West Virginia (endorsed Gary Johnson)
 Aimee Winder Newton, Member of the Salt Lake County Council
 Tomás Regalado, Mayor of Miami

Other public figures

Staff, advisors, activists, relations, actors, singer-songwriters

 Steve Baer, former president, United Republican Fund of Illinois
 Laura Bush, First Lady of the United States (2001–2009); First Lady of Texas (1995–2000)
 Marvin Bush, son of George H. W. Bush, brother of George W. Bush and Jeb Bush (endorsed Gary Johnson)
 Al Cardenas, former chair of the Republican Party of Florida
 Patrick Chovanec, economist
 Beau Correll, attorney, political activist (led Free The Delegates movement, filed successful federal lawsuit to unbind delegates)
 Alyssa Farah Griffin, Communications Director for the U.S. House of Representatives Freedom Caucus, Congressional intern (wrote in Paul Ryan) 
 Five for Fighting, singer-songwriter
 Mindy Finn, political consultant, strategist, and activist (Independent running mate for Evan McMullin)
 Patricia Heaton, actress 
 Juan Hernandez, political consultant, co-founder of Hispanic Republicans of Texas (endorsed Gary Johnson)
 Matt Higgins, former press secretary for New York City Mayor Rudy Giuliani (endorsed Hillary Clinton)
 Dwayne Johnson, actor 
 Robert Kagan, former foreign policy advisor and speechwriter (endorsed Hillary Clinton)
 Matt Kibbe, libertarian ideals advocate
 Jimmy LaSalvia, co-founder of GOProud (endorsed Hillary Clinton)
 Sarah Longwell, political advisor
 Kevin Madden, spokesperson for 2012 presidential nominee, Mitt Romney
 Ken Mehlman, former Chair of the Republican National Committee
 Mike Murphy, political consultant and commentator (indirectly endorsed Hillary Clinton)
 William F. B. O'Reilly, political strategist, conservative columnist
 Freddie Prinze Jr., actor
 Patrick Ruffini, political strategist
 Mark Salter, chief aide to John McCain (endorsed Hillary Clinton)
 Randy Scheunemann, national security and foreign policy advisor
 Steve Schmidt, campaign strategist
 Gabriel Schoenfeld, former Senior Advisor to 2012 presidential nominee Mitt Romney
 Lionel Sosa, political consultant (endorsed Hillary Clinton)
 A. J. Spiker, Chair of the Iowa Republican Party
 Stuart Stevens, political consultant and strategist
 Mac Stipanovich, strategist and lobbyist; former Chief of Staff to Bob Martinez (endorsed Hillary Clinton)
 John Weaver, strategist
 Rick Wilson, political consultant and former Republican strategist.

Academics, journalists, authors, commentators

Business leaders

 Daniel Akerson, former Chairman and CEO of General Motors (endorsed Hillary Clinton)
 Marc Andreessen, co-founder of Netscape; founder of Andreessen Horowitz (endorsed Hillary Clinton)
 Mike Fernandez, founder of MBF Healthcare Partners (endorsed Hillary Clinton)
 Seth Klarman, founder of Baupost Group (endorsed Hillary Clinton)
 Hamid R. Moghadam, CEO of Prologis (endorsed Hillary Clinton)
 James Murren, Chairman and CEO of MGM Resorts International (endorsed Hillary Clinton)
 William Oberndorf, Chairman of Oberndorf Enterprises (endorsed Hillary Clinton)
 Chuck Robbins, CEO of Cisco Systems (endorsed Hillary Clinton)
 Paul Singer, founder and CEO of Elliott Management Corporation
 Harry E. Sloan, former CEO of Metro-Goldwyn-Mayer (endorsed Hillary Clinton)
 Jack Welch, former CEO of General Electric
 Meg Whitman, CEO of Hewlett Packard Enterprise; former CEO of eBay; 2010 California nominee for Governor of California (endorsed Hillary Clinton)

Republican groups
Amherst College Republicans
Brown University Republicans
Cornell Republicans (endorsed Gary Johnson)
Harvard Republican Club
Ithaca College Republicans
Kenyon Republicans
Log Cabin Republicans
New Mexico College Republicans (endorsed Gary Johnson)
Penn State College Republicans
Princeton University Republicans
Rice University College Republicans
Texas A&M University College Republicans
University of Houston College Republicans
The University of the South College Republicans
 UVA College Republicans

Demographics
Research on the Never Trump movement shows that Mormon and female Republicans were the most likely groups to oppose Trump's candidacy while non-Mormon and male Republicans were the most supportive. In the same study, establishment Republicans were found to be more likely to support Trump's candidacy, the opposite of what most observers, including Donald Trump himself, claimed.

See also
 Newspaper endorsements in the United States presidential election, 2016
 Protests against Donald Trump
 Republican and conservative support for Barack Obama in 2008
 Republican In Name Only
 Stop Trump movement
 List of Democrats who opposed the Hillary Clinton 2016 presidential campaign
 List of former Trump administration officials who endorsed Joe Biden
 List of Republicans who opposed the Donald Trump 2020 presidential campaign
 List of Donald Trump 2016 presidential campaign endorsements
 List of Evan McMullin 2016 presidential campaign endorsements
 List of Gary Johnson 2016 presidential campaign endorsements
 List of Hillary Clinton 2016 presidential campaign non-political endorsements
 List of Hillary Clinton 2016 presidential campaign political endorsements
 List of Jill Stein 2016 presidential campaign endorsements

Notes

References

Republicans opposing

Republicans
Republicans who opposed Trump
Republican Party (United States)-related lists